The Kyiv Urban Electric Train is an urban rail transit passenger service in Kyiv, Ukraine. The service is operated by Ukrainian Railways and Kyivpastrans. The project uses a long-existing railroad ring in the city for peak hour circulation of electric multiple unit trains.

Working 2 since September 2009 Kyiv Urban Electric Train is the first instance of a combined municipal railway service and an intracity passenger rail route in Ukraine, and arguably in the former Soviet Union as a whole.

The ring was fully completed on 4 October 2011, the full length of lines is 50.8 km with 15 stations. Opening hours are from 5:48 until 21:37 with a time between trains of between 10 and 30 minutes. 12 trains operate on the line; the fastest time to complete a loop is 1 hour and 25 minutes. A train ticket costs ₴8.

Name
The project intentionally uses the colloquial Ukrainian term electrychka ("electric train") as its official name. This reflects the essence of the service, which is provided with exactly the same rolling stock and railway personnel that are used for the conventional electrychka commuter rail since Soviet rule.

Another name, kiltseve metro (a Kyiv "ring metro") was sometimes used, but never became official or widespread.

Infrastructure
All the railroad infrastructure the Kyiv Urban Electric Train utilizes already existed in the city and is shared with other services of the Ukrzaliznytsia (both passenger and freight). However, not all of the Kyiv's rail stations and halts are served by the project.

The trains depart from and arrive to the dedicated terminus platform at the Darnytsia Station, thus making a circle on the Kyiv ring railroad through the Kyiv Passenger Railway Station. However, not all of the trains commence full circle: some early and last runs start or terminate at the Kyiv-Volynskyi Station. Passengers are advised to consult with the schedule and pay attention to the on-platform audio announcements.

Connections with other public transport
Kyiv Urban Electric Train is designed as a mean of transporting passengers to- and from the Kyiv Metro stations and major public transport routes. Thus, all stops for the moment are essentially multimodal transfer hubs.

Rolling stock

Similar railroads
Yamanote Line
Osaka Loop Line
Moscow Central Circle
Berlin Ringbahn

References

External links
 
Semi-official web site  - contains timetable, passenger information etc.
Urban Electric Train schedule in English on the Southwestern Railways's official site.

Urban Electric Train
Urban ring railways
2009 establishments in Ukraine